Magadenovac is a municipality in Osijek-Baranja County, Croatia. There are 1,936 inhabitants, 86.88% of whom are Croats while 10.07% are Serbs (2011 census).

References

External links
 

Municipalities of Croatia